This is a list of AEW Dynamite special episodes, detailing all professional wrestling television special cards promoted on AEW Dynamite by All Elite Wrestling (AEW).

On May 8, 2019, AEW reached a new media rights deal with British media company ITV plc to broadcast their shows on ITV4. On May 15, 2019, AEW and Warner Bros. Discovery announced a deal for a weekly prime-time show airing live on TNT and would also stream live events and pay-per-views on Bleacher Report in the United States and Canada. On September 25, 2019, AEW announced an international streaming deal with FITE TV primarily for regions outside of the United States and Canada via the "AEW Plus" package, which includes live streaming and replay access of Dynamite in simulcast with its U.S. airing. In Canada, Bell Media's TSN acquired broadcast rights to Dynamite, marking the return of professional wrestling to the network after WWE Raw moved to rival network The Score (now Sportsnet 360) in 2006. The show is broadcast in simulcast with TNT in the U.S (but is subject to scheduling) and is streamed on TSN Direct as well as TSN's website.

Special episodes

2019

2020

2021

2022

2023

See also 

List of All Elite Wrestling special events
List of All Elite Wrestling pay-per-view events
Wednesday Night Wars

Notes

References

External links

Special episodes
Professional wrestling-related lists
Lists of television episodes